Bumble is a New Zealand children's television series for children ages 2–7 featuring a magical bee. The title character is voiced by Jason Gunn. The series is produced for TVNZ by Gunn's wife, Janine Morrell-Gunn

It also features Bumble's puppet friends: Peek, Boo, Anna and Fishy. The show officially started in 1999 and ended in 2002.

Fishy is Maori, and known for his tagline "Kia Ora Bumble".

On 15 February 2020, Jason Gunn has announced that WhitebaitMedia & NZ on Air will make a new revival series for the new CGI animated & pre-school show Bumble, it's definite airdate is currently unknown

Cast 
 Jason Gunn as the voice of Bumble, a bumblebee
 Chris Harding as Peek, a mouse (singing voice by Adrian Kirk, Puppetered by Chris Lynch)
 Lynda Milligan as Anna, a mouse
 Janice Bateman as Boo, a mouse (singing voice by Bronwyn Williams)
 Olly Ohlson as Fishy, a brown trout

Episodes 
Welcome To Kiwifruit Valley

Peek Gets Stage Fright

Muddled Messages

Fire Fire

Hide And Seek

The Missing Drink

Afraid Of The  Dark

Bossy Boo

Dirty Water

Dreams Come True

Bumble's Christmas

Fears 

Four Seasons

The Treasure Map

Peek's Fishbus

Keep Fit Peek

Boo Gets Sunburnt

Fishy's Tale

Fishy's Orchestra

Wearable Arts

Missing You

Bumble's Pumpkin Trouble

The Great Big Enormous Sunflower

Another Way To Share

Bumble's Photo Album

Midnight Feast

Who Will Help Me

Flying Fishy

Tender Loving Care 

Kiwi

Peek's Not So Magic 

Fishy's Underwater Adventure

Peek Gets Stuck

Puha

Paintings For Fishy

Bumble And The Moon 

Peek’s Puddle 

Maui Bumble And The Sun

Fishy And Friends Pull Up A Waka Huia

Don't Look At The Sun

Detective Fishy

Peapod

Bumble's Juggling Surprise

Water

Pepetuna

Sleep Well Bumble

Peek Gets Into Hot Water

Cry Baby

Don't Tell Fishy

Honey

Sweet Dreams Bumble

Peek's Itchy Whiskers

Hansel Peek And Gretal Boo

Val-Der-Ri

Peek Boo And Bumble Enter A Song Contest

The Hangi

Round Things

Bumble's B

Maui And The Big Fish

Grab And Gobble

Nahau I Horoi Oniho

Wait We're Late

The Swing

Making Purple

Play With Me

Fishy's Hui

Peek Goes To The Moon

Five Plus

The Adventures Of Maxi Mouse

The Trouble With Teepees

Coast To Coast 

Ozzy

The Sky Is Falling 

The Kiwifruit Valley Festival

International Broadcast
Bumble also aired in Australia on ABC Kids presumably between 2001 and 2002 on reruns.

References

External links
Bumble on the TVNZ website

1999 New Zealand television series debuts
2002 New Zealand television series endings
1990s New Zealand television series
2020s New Zealand television series
2020 New Zealand television series debuts
New Zealand children's television series
New Zealand television shows featuring puppetry
TVNZ original programming
Television shows funded by NZ on Air
1990s preschool education television series
2000s preschool education television series
Bees in popular culture
Television series about insects